Black Axe may refer to:

 Black Axe (organized crime group), a Nigerian international criminal organization
 Black Axe (comic book), a comic book series published by Marvel UK
 Mouse Guard: Black Axe, a Mouse Guard comic book mini-series